Autódromo Ciudad de Pigüé is a motor racing circuit located near Pigüé, in Buenos Aires Province, Argentina. It is a circuit that has hosted competitions Turismo Nacional, TC 2000 and TC de Sudoeste. Circuit No. 1, has an extension of 3,001 m with 14 curves.

References

Motorsport venues in Buenos Aires Province